Sherlock Holmes: The Devil's Daughter is an adventure mystery video game in the Sherlock Holmes series developed by Frogwares for Microsoft Windows, PlayStation 4 and Xbox One in 2016. It was released for the Xbox One and PlayStation 4 on 25 October, while the PC version was released earlier on June 10.

Gameplay
Like its predecessor Sherlock Holmes: Crimes & Punishments, the majority of the game involves exploring crime scenes and examining clues. Once discovered, clues are added to a "deduction board", a gameplay mechanic which involves linking pieces of information together, leading to possibilities for different deductions. Once deductions are connected together, the player will have a full tree of deductions in the player's memory called mind palace. Depending on how players interpret the clues, they will arrive at different conclusions. Thus, the player can fail or succeed in finding the culprit.

Premise
Across five linked cases, Sherlock Holmes confronts dark family secrets, both in his cases and personally, when a visiting woman begins interfering in his personal life, especially with his adopted daughter.

Plot
Set in 1896, following the events of The Testament of Sherlock Holmes, after Professor James Moriarty's death, Sherlock Holmes is now taking care of Moriarty's daughter, Katelyn, while keeping her true origin as a secret. However, the situation changes when a mysterious woman known as "Alice" becomes Holmes's new neighbor. Alice slowly befriends Katelyn, eventually earning the daughter's trust while causing emotional issues between Holmes and Katelyn at the same time. Throughout the game, Holmes will solve different cases while getting to know Alice's origin and her true intention. 

The game features five separate cases. Each case is self-contained and apart from in-game achievements, such as moral choices, do not relate to one another. The cases are as follows:

Prey Tell:
Holmes is visited by a young boy, Tom, whose father has gone missing. With the help of Wiggins, Holmes investigates and finds a string of related disappearances linked to a distinguished British benefactor. The benefactor and his aristocratic friends use paupers as hunting prey in Epping Forest and are in turn hunted by Tom's father, a distinguished veteran and a military sniper.

A Study in Green:
Holmes competes in a lawn bowls tournament hosted by a local Archaeological Society. The award ceremony is called off after a member of the club is found dead under mysterious circumstances, and the case ties back to an earlier Mayan expedition. Suspects include an eccentric mechanics enthusiast, a bankrupt club manager and a one-armed man with a mysterious companion.

Infamy:
Holmes is followed around by an actor seeking to study him for an upcoming role. After he solves the case of Mary Sutherland (adapted from "A Case of Identity"), Holmes thwarts an attempt on his own life by defusing a bomb all by himself. Later investigations uncover a series of burglaries and a disappearance that all lead him to an abandoned abbey. Holmes former triumphs against the criminal underworld seek revenge.

Chain Reaction:
While travelling, Holmes and Watson encounter a massive road accident that has killed and injured several people. Holmes investigates the area to deduce the series of events, finding the situation is not what it appears. A criminal-turned-technician, strong-armed into being accomplice to a heist turns the tables on his former partners.

Fever Dreams:
Alice has kidnapped his adopted daughter. He must find her before it's too late. Holmes' reticence about the origins of his adopted daughter are revealed by Alice: Katelyn is the daughter of Professor James Moriarty and thus the eponymous Devil's Daughter. Holmes makes amends for his parental apathy and reunites with his ward.

Development and release
An eighth installment in the series was announced in May 2015. Kerry Shale was originally expected to reprise his role as Sherlock, but was later confirmed by Frogwares that the game would focus on a different incarnation of Sherlock Holmes featuring Alex Jordan in the titular role.

In an interview in 2020, Frogwares claimed Bigben Interactive was only a distribution intermediary.

Reception

GameSpot awarded it a score of 6.0 out of 10, criticising some major technical issues and some action elements. IGN awarded it a score of 5.0 out of 10. PC Gamer awarded it a score of 59 out of 100, criticising the game for heavily scripted set-pieces, quick time events and mini-games.

The Devil's Daughter received "mixed or average" reviews. Aggregating review website Metacritic gave the Microsoft Windows version 65/100 based on 19 reviews, the PlayStation 4 version 71/100 based on 28 reviews,  and the Xbox One version 66/100 based on 12 reviews.

See also
Yesterday Origins

Notes

References

External links

2016 video games
Action-adventure games
Sherlock Holmes (video game series)
Detective video games
Nintendo Switch games
PlayStation 4 games
Unreal Engine games
Video games based on Sherlock Holmes
Video games developed in Ukraine
Video games set in London
Video games set in the 19th century
Windows games
Xbox One games
Frogwares games
Single-player video games